Centaurea melitensis (called Maltese star-thistle in Europe, tocalote or tocolote in western North America) is an annual plant in the family Asteraceae,  high, with resin-dotted leaves and spine-tipped phyllaries. This plant is native to the Mediterranean region of Europe and Africa. It was introduced to North America in the 18th century; the first documented occurrence in California is in the adobe of a building constructed in San Fernando in 1797. It is also naturalized on a number of Pacific islands.

Conservation
It is considered rare on the Maltese Islands, being listed in the Red Data Book.

Gallery

References

University of California, Davis, Agricultural and Natural Resources

External links
Jepson Manual Treatment
Photo gallery

melitensis
Plants described in 1753
Taxa named by Carl Linnaeus
Flora of Malta